Thurston County is a county located in the U.S. state of Washington. As of the 2020 census, its population was 294,793. The county seat and largest city is Olympia, the state capital.

Thurston County was created out of Lewis County by the government of Oregon Territory on January 12, 1852. At that time, it covered all of the Puget Sound region and the Olympic Peninsula. On December 22 of the same year, Pierce, King, Island, and Jefferson counties were split off from Thurston County. It is named after Samuel R. Thurston, the Oregon Territory's first delegate to Congress.

Thurston County comprises the Olympia-Tumwater, WA Metropolitan Statistical Area and is included in the Seattle-Tacoma, WA Combined Statistical Area.

Geography

Major watersheds:  Black River, Budd/Deschutes, Chehalis River, Eld Inlet, Henderson Inlet, Nisqually River, Skookumchuck River, Totten Inlet and West Capitol Forest.

Geographic features

Alder Lake
Bald Hill Lake
Barnes Lake
Bass Lake
Bigelow Lake
Black Lake
Black River
Budd Inlet
Capitol Lake
Capitol Peak
Capitol State Forest
Chambers Lake
Chehalis River
Clear Lake
Deep Lake
Deschutes River
Elbow Lake
Eld Inlet
Fifteen Lake
Gehrke Lake
Grass Lake
Henderson Inlet
Hewitt Lake
Hicks Lake
Lake Lawrence
Lois Lake
Long Lake
McIntosh Lake
Mima Mounds
Munn Lake
Nisqually River
Offut Lake
Patterson Lake
Puget Sound
Reichel Lake
Rocky Prairie
Saint Clair Lake
Scott Lake
Simmons Lake
Skookumchuck River
Smith Lake
Southwick Lake
Springer Lake
Summit Lake
Susan Lake
Totten Inlet
Trails End Lake
Trosper Lake
Ward Lake

Major highways
 Interstate 5
 U.S. 12
 U.S. 101
 SR 507
 SR 510

Adjacent counties
Pierce County – northeast
Lewis County – south
Grays Harbor County – west
Mason County – north/northwest

National protected areas
Nisqually National Wildlife Refuge

Demographics

2000 census
As of the census of 2000, there were 207,355 people, 81,625 households and 54,933 families living in the county. The population density was 285 per square mile (110/km2). There were 86,652 housing units at an average density of 119 per square mile (46/km2). The racial makeup of the county was 85.66% White, 2.35% Black or African American, 1.52% Native American, 4.41% Asian, 0.52% Pacific Islander, 1.69% from other races, and 3.85% from two or more races. 4.53% of the population were Hispanic or Latino of any race. 17.1% were of German, 10.2% English, 9.8% Irish, 6.9% United States or American and 5.5% Norwegian ancestry.

There were 81,625 households, of which 33.00% had children under the age of 18 living with them, 53.10% were married couples living together, 10.30% had a female householder with no husband present, and 32.70% were non-families. 25.10% of all households were made up of individuals, and 8.00% had someone living alone who was 65 years of age or older. The average household size was 2.50 and the average family size was 2.99.

Age distribution was 25.30% under the age of 18, 9.30% from 18 to 24, 29.30% from 25 to 44, 24.60% from 45 to 64, and 11.40% who were 65 years of age or older. The median age was 36 years. For every 100 females, there were 96.00 males. For every 100 females age 18 and over, there were 92.70 males.

The median household income was $46,975, and the median family income was $55,027. Males had a median income of $40,521 versus $30,368 for females. The per capita income for the county was $22,415. About 5.80% of families and 8.80% of the population were below the poverty line, including 9.80% of those under age 18 and 5.00% of those age 65 or over.

2010 census
As of the 2010 census, there were 252,264 people, 100,650 households, and 66,161 families living in the county. The racial makeup of the county was 82.4% white, 5.2% Asian, 2.7% black or African American, 1.4% American Indian, 0.8% Pacific islander, 2.2% from other races, and 5.3% from two or more races. Those of Hispanic or Latino origin made up 7.1% of the population. In terms of ancestry, 21.2% were German, 13.4% were English, 13.2% were Irish, 5.0% were Norwegian, and 4.7% were American.

Of the 100,650 households, 31.7% had children under the age of 18 living with them, 49.9% were married couples living together, 11.4% had a female householder with no husband present, 34.3% were non-families, and 25.9% of all households were made up of individuals. The average household size was 2.46 and the average family size was 2.95. The median age was 38.5 years.

The median income for a household in the county was $60,930 and the median income for a family was $71,833. Males had a median income of $53,679 versus $41,248 for females. The per capita income for the county was $29,707. About 7.1% of families and 10.3% of the population were below the poverty line, including 13.0% of those under age 18 and 5.9% of those age 65 or over.

Education
School Districts in Thurston County, including those that have majorities of land in other counties:

 Centralia School District
 Griffin School District
 North Thurston Public Schools
 Olympia School District
 Rainier School District
 Rochester School District
 Tenino School District
 Tumwater School District
 Yelm Community Schools

Higher Education in Thurston County:

Evergreen State College
Saint Martin's University
South Puget Sound Community College

Media
The Olympian, founded in 1889, is the newspaper of record for Thurston County.
The Weekly Volcano has covered Thurston County entertainment since 2001.

Communities

Cities
Lacey
Olympia (county seat)
Rainier
Tenino
Tumwater
Yelm

Towns
Bucoda

Census-designated places
Grand Mound
Nisqually Indian Community
North Yelm
Rochester
Tanglewilde-Thompson Place

Unincorporated communities

Boston Harbor
Driftwood
East Olympia
Gate
Indian Summer
Kellys Corner
Lake Lawrence
Littlerock
Maytown
Mushroom Corner
Offutt Lake
Saint Clair
Schneiders Prairie
Skookumchuck
South Bay
Steamboat Island
Union Mill
Vail

Ghost towns
Tono

Politics
Thurston County leans Democratic. The county has voted for the Democratic presidential candidate since 1988 and the candidates have consistently received majority of the vote in the county.

See also
National Register of Historic Places listings in Thurston County, Washington

References

External links

Thurston County, official county site
Thurton County Chamber of Commerce
Thurston County Transmission
OlympiaCommunitySchool.org – Independent K-3 Education
Thurston Conservation District – Local Solutions to Local Problems
Thurston County Solid Waste – Waste prevention tips to become more green
Olympia-Lacey-Tumwater Visitor & Convention Bureau

 
Seattle metropolitan area
1852 establishments in Oregon Territory
Populated places established in 1852
Western Washington